Farhan Navab (born 1 July 1956) is an Iranian sprinter. He competed in the men's 100 metres at the 1972 Summer Olympics.

References

External links
 

1956 births
Living people
Athletes (track and field) at the 1972 Summer Olympics
Iranian male sprinters
Olympic athletes of Iran
Place of birth missing (living people)